Harvey James Rodgers (born 20 October 1996) is an English professional footballer who plays as a defender for Accrington Stanley.

Career

In January 2017 Rodgers joined Accrington Stanley on loan with fellow Hull City player Jonathan Edwards, He made his league debut against Carlise United.

In July 2017 Rodgers signed for Fleetwood Town. On his debut for Fleetwood he was sent off in an EFL Cup defeat to Carlisle United.

In December 2018 Rodgers joined National League side Hartlepool United on loan.

Career statistics

Club

References

External links
 
 

1996 births
Living people
Footballers from York
English footballers
Hull City A.F.C. players
Accrington Stanley F.C. players
Hartlepool United F.C. players
Fleetwood Town F.C. players
English Football League players
National League (English football) players
Association football defenders